Daniel Taillon (born 9 October 1952) is a Canadian hurdler. He competed in the men's 110 metres hurdles at the 1976 Summer Olympics.

References

1952 births
Living people
Athletes (track and field) at the 1976 Summer Olympics
Athletes (track and field) at the 1978 Commonwealth Games
Canadian male hurdlers
Olympic track and field athletes of Canada
Commonwealth Games competitors for Canada
Athletes from Montreal